The Perchiu is a left tributary of the river Polocin in Romania. It flows into the Polocin near Prădaiș.

References

Rivers of Romania
Rivers of Bacău County